Greater London has a number of waste disposal authorities, responsible for waste collection and disposal.   Prior to the abolition of the Greater London Council in 1986, it was the waste authority for Greater London.

Joint authorities
There are four statutory joint waste authorities, as follows:

The joint authorities are made up of councillors nominated from the borough councils.  They are funded by a levy on the local authorities.

Independent authorities

The other boroughs—that is to say the City of Westminster and the City of London along with Bexley, Bromley, Croydon, Greenwich, Kingston, Lewisham, Merton, Southwark, Sutton and Tower Hamlets—are independent waste authorities in their own right.

The four boroughs of Croydon, Kingston, Merton and Sutton work together in a voluntary capacity as the South London Waste Partnership.

Calls for a single waste authority

The ODPM proposed in 2006, as part of other transfers of powers to the Greater London Authority, to give it a waste function. The Mayor of London has made repeated attempts to bring the different waste authorities together, to form a single waste authority in London similar to the Greater Manchester Waste Disposal Authority which deals with waste from all households in Greater Manchester. This has faced significant opposition from existing authorities. However, it has had significant support from all other sectors and the surrounding regions managing most of London's waste.

See also
Mucking Marshes Landfill

References

External links
East London Waste Authority
Western Riverside Waste Authority
North London Waste Authority
West London Waste Authority

Greater London Council replacement organisations
Local government in London
Waste disposal authorities
Waste management in London
Waste organizations